During the 1988–89 season Sunderland competed in the Football League Second Division. They finished 11th in the league after being promoted from the Third Division the previous season.

Squad

Results
Sunderland's score comes first.

Friendlies

Second Division

League table

League Cup

Full Members Cup

FA Cup

Statistics

References 

Sunderland A.F.C. seasons
Sun